Arequipa-Antofalla is a basement unit underlying the central Andes in northwestern Argentina, western Bolivia, northern Chile and southern Peru. Geologically, it corresponds to a craton, terrane or block of continental crust. Arequipa-Antofalla collided and amalgamated with the Amazonian craton about 1000 Ma ago during the Sunsás orogeny. As a terrane Arequipa-Antofalla was ribbon-shaped during the Paleozoic, a time when it was bounded by the west by the Iapetus Ocean and by the east by the Puncoviscana Ocean.

References 

Cratons
Geology of Argentina
Geology of Bolivia
Geology of Chile
Geology of Peru
Terranes
Precambrian South America
Geology of the Andes